The 2018 WSBL season was the 30th season of the Women's State Basketball League (SBL). The regular season began on Friday 16 March, with round 1 seeing a 2017 grand final rematch between the Perry Lakes Hawks and Mandurah Magic. The 2018 WSBL All-Star Game was played on 4 June at Bendat Basketball Centre – the home of basketball in Western Australia. The regular season ended on Saturday 28 July. The finals began on Friday 3 August and ended on Friday 31 August, when the Lakeside Lightning defeated the Magic in the WSBL Grand Final.

Regular season
The regular season began on Friday 16 March and ended on Saturday 28 July after 20 rounds of competition. Again in 2018, all games over the Easter Weekend were played on a blockbuster Thursday night with six venues all hosting games before the league took a break for the Easter long weekend. Anzac Round took place in round 6 of the competition with the Kalamunda Eastern Suns and Willetton Tigers continuing their Anzac Day game tradition. In round 9, Women's Round took place in alignment with Mother's Day on Sunday 13 May. During this round, WSBL games were played at the later timeslot at each venue following the MSBL games. There was also Rivalry Round in round 12 and Heritage Round in round 16.

Standings

Finals
The finals began on Friday 3 August and ended on Friday 31 August with the WSBL Grand Final.

Bracket

All-Star Game
The 2018 WSBL All-Star Game took place at Bendat Basketball Centre on Monday 4 June, with all proceeds going to Red Frogs Australia.

Rosters

Game data

Awards

Player of the Week

Statistics leaders

Regular season
 Most Valuable Player: Alison Schwagmeyer (Lakeside Lightning)
 Coach of the Year: Craig Mansfield (Lakeside Lightning)
 Most Improved Player: Jewel Williams (Kalamunda Eastern Suns)
 All-WSBL First Team:
 PG: Alison Schwagmeyer (Lakeside Lightning)
 SG: Anita Brown (Mandurah Magic)
 SF: Antonia Farnworth (Perry Lakes Hawks)
 PF: Jennie Rintala (Kalamunda Eastern Suns)
 C: Kayla Steindl (Perth Redbacks)
 All-Defensive Team:
 PG: Brianna Moyes (Cockburn Cougars)
 SG: Alex Ciabattoni (Kalamunda Eastern Suns)
 SF: Antonia Farnworth (Perry Lakes Hawks)
 PF: Ashleigh Grant (Lakeside Lightning)
 C: Maddie Allen (Rockingham Flames)

Finals
 Grand Final MVP: Alison Schwagmeyer (Lakeside Lightning)

References

External links
 2018 fixtures
 2018 season preview
 All-Star starters
 2018 grand final preview

2018
2017–18 in Australian basketball
2018–19 in Australian basketball
basketball